P. robusta  may refer to:
 Pancheria robusta, a plant species endemic to New Caledonia
 Pandesma robusta, a moth species found in the South of Europe, throughout Africa and from Asia Minor to India and Pakistan
 Partula robusta, an extinct gastropod species endemic to French Polynesia
 Pentagenia robusta, an insect species endemic to the United States
 Protarchaeopteryx robusta, a turkey-sized feathered theropod dinosaur species from China
 Pyrgulopsis robusta, the Jackson lake springsnail, a very small or minute freshwater snail species endemic to the United States

See also
 Robusta (disambiguation)